Roseibium salinum is a Gram-negative, halophilic, rod-shaped, non-endospore-forming and motile bacterium from the genus Roseibium which has been isolated from the rhizosphere of the halophyte, Arthrocnemum macrostachyum.

References

External links
Type strain of Labrenzia salina at BacDive -  the Bacterial Diversity Metadatabase

Rhodobacteraceae
Bacteria described in 2016